Swarnam is a 2008 Malayalam language Indian drama film, directed by Venugopan and written by S. Suresh Babu. It stars Kalabhavan Mani and Praveena in lead roles and also features Jagathy Sreekumar, Indrans, Valsala Menon, Ashokan, Murali and Kozhikode Narayanan Nair in supporting roles. It was released in May 2008.

Cast
 Kalabhavan Mani as Dhivakaran
 Praveena as Radha
 Murali as Raghavan
 Baby Nayanthara
 Jagathy Sreekumar
 Indrans
 Valsala Menon
 Ashokan 
 Kozhikode Narayanan Nair
 Shreyas Madhavan

References

External links
 

2008 films
2000s Malayalam-language films